Edmond Heelan (February 5, 1868 – September 20, 1948) was an Irish-born prelate of the Roman Catholic Church. He served as bishop of the Diocese of Sioux City in Iowa from 1920 until his death in 1948.

Biography

Early life 
Edmond Heelan was born on February 5, 1868, in Elton, County Limerick, Ireland, to John and Anne (née Quish) Heelan. He studied philosophy and theology at All Hallows College in Dublin.

Heelan was ordained to the priesthood in Dublin for the Diocese of Dubuque on June 24, 1890. After his ordination, he immigrated to United States, where he was appointed as a curate St. Raphael's Cathedral Parish in Dubuque, Iowa. Heelan was appointed rector at St. Raphael's in 1893. In 1897, he was appointed pastor of Sacred Heart Parish in Fort Dodge, Iowa.

Auxiliary Bishop and Bishop of Sioux City 
On December 21, 1918, Heelan was appointed as an auxiliary bishop of the Diocese of Sioux City and titular bishop of Gerasa by Pope Benedict XV. He received his episcopal consecration on April 8, 1919, from Archbishop James Keane, with Bishops James J. Davis and Patrick McGovern serving as co-consecrators. As an auxiliary bishop, he served as rector of the Cathedral of the Epiphany in Sioux City.

Following the death of Bishop Philip Garrigan, Benedict XV appointed Heelan as the second bishop of Sioux City on March 8, 1920. During his term as bishop, Neelan greatly expanded Catholic education in the diocese. 

Heelan attended the 1928 International Eucharistic Conference in Sydney, Australia.  In 1929, Heelan donated land in Sioux City to the Sisters of St. Francis for the establishment of Briar Cliff College for women.  He was named assistant to the papal throne in 1941 by Pope Pius XII.

Edmond Heelan died on September 20, 1948 at age 80 in Sioux City.  Heelan Hall at Brier Cliff is named after him.

References

1868 births
1948 deaths
American Roman Catholic clergy of Irish descent
Clergy from County Limerick
Alumni of All Hallows College, Dublin
Irish emigrants to the United States (before 1923)
20th-century Roman Catholic bishops in the United States
Roman Catholic bishops of Sioux City
Roman Catholic Archdiocese of Dubuque
People from Fort Dodge, Iowa